Lets the Charms Last Long is a 1984 Soviet drama film directed by Yaropolk Lapshin.

Plot 
Anton Skvortsov, a strong and strong-willed person, led a large team all his life, but now he is a pensioner, he buried his wife a year and a half ago, and stayed with his daughter, her husband and adult granddaughter in a large apartment that belongs to him, and recently he also suffered a heart attack.

The attending physician recommended that his daughter send Anton Nikolaevich to the veterans' house. Unable to withstand these conversations, Anton Nikolaevich runs away from home and goes on a tour of Moscow. On a sightseeing bus, he meets Anna Konstantinovna, who has just retired. This meeting turns his whole life upside down.

Cast 
 Iya Savvina as Anna Konstantinovna Sharygina
 Oleg Yefremov as  Anton Nikolaevich Skvortsov
 Aleftina Yevdokimova as Tatiana, Skvortsov's daughter  
 Leonid Kulagin as doctor (voiced by Aleksandr  Belyavsky)
 Marina Yakovleva as Lyuba, Skvortsov's granddaughter
 Nina Arkhipova as Elena Georgievna, Skvortsov's neighbor  
 Boris Bystrov as Zhenya
 Inna Ulyanova as Faina
 Eduard Martsevich as writer

References

External links 
 

1984 films
1980s Russian-language films
Soviet drama films
1984 drama films